Pass the Buck is a game show that aired on CBS television's daytime lineup from April 3 to June 30, 1978. The series was hosted by Bill Cullen and was created by Bob Stewart. Bob Clayton was the announcer.

Gameplay
Four contestants competed to give a list of items that fit into a specific category announced at the beginning of each round (e.g., first names with exactly four letters, things that are inflated). The bank for each game started at $100. Each contestant gave one answer at a time, proceeding left to right from the audience's perspective, and $25 was added to the bank for each valid answer.

If a contestant repeated a previous response, failed to respond within the allotted time, or gave a response that the judges deemed invalid, the next contestant in line could eliminate him/her by giving an acceptable answer. If consecutive contestants missed, an acceptable response by the next contestant in line eliminated all of them. However, if all the contestants gave invalid responses, the category was thrown out and a new one was announced to begin the next round. A new category was also given whenever one or more contestants were eliminated.

The game ended once three of the contestants were eliminated. The last one standing won the bank and played the Fast Bucks round.

Fast Bucks
In Fast Bucks, the surviving contestant faced a game board with four rows, with one box on the top row and each row below it containing one more box. Starting on the bottom and working up, a specific category was given (e.g., reference books, U.S. states) and the contestant had 15 seconds to give as many answers as possible that fit it. The object was to match the answers hidden behind the boxes on any single row. The three eliminated contestants stayed onstage to observe the round, as the winner's performance dictated whether or not they could continue playing.

As long as the winning contestant matched at least one answer on a row, he/she advanced to the next one and was given a new category. If he/she failed to match any answers, the round ended and he/she received $100 for every revealed answer. All four contestants then began a new game.

To earn the championship, the contestant had to either match all of the answers on any one row or match at least one answer on each of the four rows. He/she won $5,000, and the other three contestants were eliminated from the show, keeping whatever money they had won. Contestants remained on the show until being eliminated by an opponent's Fast Bucks win, or until they reached the $25,000 winnings limit that was in force for CBS game shows at the time.

Broadcast history
Pass the Buck aired on CBS at 10:00 AM (9:00 Central), initially for the first three weeks facing reruns of Sanford and Son on NBC, then Card Sharks. Following its last episode which aired June 30, 1978, the program was replaced by Tic-Tac-Dough.

Taping location
The show videotaped during its brief run at the Ed Sullivan Theater in New York City, now the home of the Late Show. To date, Pass the Buck is the last game show to tape there.

External links

References

CBS original programming
1970s American game shows
1978 American television series debuts
1978 American television series endings
Television series by Bob Stewart Productions
Television series by Sony Pictures Television